Lentibacillus garicola is a Gram-positive, aerobic and moderately halophilic bacterium from the genus of Lentibacillus which has been isolated from Myeolchi-aekjeot.

References

Bacillaceae
Bacteria described in 2015